La Copa Junior VIP (2017) (Spanish for "The New Values Junior Cup") was a professional wrestling tournament produced and scripted by the Mexican wrestling promotion Consejo Mundial de Lucha Libre (CMLLl; Spanish "World Wrestling Council"). The tournament took place on December 1, 2017, in Arena México in Mexico City, Mexico. CMLL's recurring La Copa Junior tournament featured second, third, or fourth-generation wrestlers competing against each other. The 2017 version of the La Copa Junior was the tenth tournament held by CMLL.

The 2017 La Copa Junior VIP tournament was contested under torneo cibernetico elimination match rules. The six man teams saw Niebla Roja, Carístico, Volador Jr., Místico, Dragon Lee, and Stuka Jr. face off against the team of Negro Casas, Mephisto, Shocker, Euforia, Sansón, and El Felino. In the end Niebla Roja pinned Mephisto to eliminate him, earning the 2017 La Copa Junior VIP trophy.

Production

Background
Starting in 1996 the Mexican professional wrestling promotion Consejo Mundial de Lucha Libre ("World Wrestling Council"; CMLL) held their first ever La Copa Junior tournament. CMLL held the tournament to celebrate the fact that lucha libre in Mexico is often a family tradition, with a large number of second, third, or even fourth generation wrestlers following the footsteps of their relatives. The premise of the tournament is that all participants are second-generation or more, although at times the family relationship is a storylines family relationship and not an actual one. One example of this is Dragón Rojo Jr. being billed as the grandson of Dragón Rojo, when in reality that is simply a storyline created by CMLL. The original La Copa Junior was won by  Héctor Garza.

CMLL would not hold another La Copa Junior until the 2005 tournament (won by Shocker), followed by a 2006 tournament won by Dos Caras Jr. The tournament did not return until 2010 where Dragón Rojo Jr. won the 2010 version. In 2012 third-generation luchador La Sombra won the Junior cup

In 2014, CMLL held two La Copa Junior tournaments, first a tournament on January 1, won by Super Halcón Jr., followed by a VIP tournament, featuring higher card wrestlers than the usual tournaments, which was won by Máximo The semi-regular tournament returned in 2016, won by Esfinge In 2017, Soberano Jr. won the La Copa Junior Nuevos Valores

Storylines
The tournament featured a number of professional wrestling matches with different wrestlers involved in pre-existing scripted feuds, plots and storylines. Wrestlers were portrayed as either heels (referred to as rudos in Mexico, those that portray the "bad guys") or faces (técnicos in Mexico, the "good guy" characters) as they followed a series of tension-building events, which culminated in a wrestling match or series of matches.

Family relationships

Tournament

Order of elimination

Results

References

2017 in professional wrestling
2017 in Mexico
CMLL La Copa Junior
December 2017 events in Mexico